The 2016 BYU Cougars baseball team represented Brigham Young University in the 2016 NCAA Division I baseball season.  Mike Littlewood acted in his fourth season as head coach of the Cougars. BYU was picked to finish fifth in the WCC Pre-season rankings. The Cougars would claim a co-regular season title before falling in the WCC Tournament.

2016 Roster

Schedule 

! style="background:#FFFFFF;color:#002654;"| Regular Season
|- 

|- align="center" bgcolor="ccffcc"
| February 19 || vs. St. Louis || – || Cashman Field  || None || 21–7 || Michael Rucker (1–0) || Matt Eckelman (0–1) || None || 300 || 1–0 || –
|- align="center" bgcolor="ccffcc"
| February 20 || vs. St. Louis || – || Cashman Field || None ||  5–0 || Maverik Buffo (1–0) || Josh Moore (0–1) || None || 500 || 2–0 || –
|- align="center" bgcolor="ccffcc"
| February 20 || vs. St. Louis || – || Cashman Field || None ||  11–3 || Hayden Rogers (1–0) || Connor Lehmann (0–1) || None || 500 || 3–0 || –
|- align="center" bgcolor="ccffcc"
| February 22 || vs. St. Louis || – || Cashman Field || None ||  11–7  || Bo Burrup (1–0) || Miller Hogan (0–1) || None || 150 || 4–0 || –
|- align="center" bgcolor="ccffcc"
| February 25 || at Samford || – || Joe Lee Griffin Stadium || None || 7–1 || Michael Rucker (2–0) || Jared Brasher (1–1) || None || 176 || 5–0 || –
|- align="center" bgcolor="ccffcc"
| February 26 || at Samford || – || Joe Lee Griffin Stadium || None || 4–3 (10) || Mason Marshall (1–0) || Parker Curry (0–1) || None || 546 || 6–0 || –
|- align="center" bgcolor="ffbbb"
| February 26 || at Samford || – || Joe Lee Griffin Stadium || None || 5–10 || Jake Greer (1–0) || Bo Burrup (1–1) ||None || 546 || 6–1 || –
|- align="center" bgcolor="ccffcc"
| February 27 || at Samford || – || Joe Lee Griffin Stadium || None || 6–4 || Riley Gates (1–0) || Connor Radcliff (1–1) || Mason Marshall (1) || 535 || 7–1 || –
|-

|- align="center" bgcolor="ccffcc"
| March 3 || at Kansas || – || Hoglund Ballpark || ESPN3 || 11–10 || Bo Burrup (2–1) || Zack Leban (1–1) || Keaton Cenatiempo (1) || 821 || 8–1 || –
|- align="center" bgcolor="ccffcc"
| March 4 || at Kansas || – || Hoglund Ballpark || ESPN3 || 8–2 || Maverik Buffo (2–0) || Ben Krauth (0–1) || Jordan Wood (1) || 990 || 9–1 || –
|- align="center" bgcolor="ccffcc"
| March 5 || at Kansas || – || Hoglund Ballpark || ESPN3 || 7–6 || Keaton Cenatiempo (1–0) || Stephen Villines (2–1) || Mason Marshall (2) || 976 || 10–1 || –
|- align="center" bgcolor="ccffcc"
| March 8 || Utah Valley || – || Larry H. Miller Field || TheW.tv || 6–1 || Maverik Buffo (3–0)  || Danny Beddes (2–2) || None || 2,002 || 11–1 || –
|- align="center" bgcolor="ccffcc"
| March 10 || Niagara || – || Larry H. Miller Field || TheW.tv  || 14–1 || Michael Rucker (3–0) || Cody Eckerson (0–2) || None || 1,297 || 12–1 || –
|- align="center" bgcolor="ccffcc"
| March 11 || Niagara || – || Larry H. Miller Field || TheW.tv  || 14–10 || Zach Brinkerhoff (1–0) || Liam Stroud (0–1) || Bo Burrup (1) || 1,758 || 13–1 || –
|- align="center" bgcolor="ccffcc"
| March 11 || Niagara || – || Larry H. Miller Field || TheW.tv || 14–2 || Hayden Rogers (2–0) || Zachary Kolodziejski (0–1) || None || 1,758 || 14–1 || –
|- align="center" bgcolor="ccffcc"
| March 12 || Niagara || – || Larry H. Miller Field || TheW.tv  || 15–3 || Connor Williams (1–0) || Robert Wilson (0–1) || None || 1,266 || 15–1 || –
|- align="center" bgcolor="ccffcc"
| March 15 || Utah || – || Larry H. Miller Field || BYUtv || 6–0 || Riley Gates (2–0) || Josh Lapiana (0–3) || None || 1,880 || 16–1 || –
|- align="center" bgcolor="ccffcc"
| March 17 || Pacific* || – || Larry H. Miller Field || BYUtv  || 19–3 || Michael Rucker (4–0) || Will Lydon (0–4) || Easton Walker (1) || 833 || 17–1 || 1–0
|- align="center" bgcolor="ccffcc"
| March 18 || Pacific* || – || Larry H. Miller Field || None || 11–4 || Maverik Buffo (4–0) || Ricky Reynoso (1–2) || None || 936 || 18–1 || 2–0
|- align="center" bgcolor="ffbbb"
| March 19 || Pacific* || – || Larry H. Miller Field || BYUtv || 8–10 || Fineas Delbonta Smith (2–1) || Mason Marshall (1–1) || Bryce Lombardi (1) || 2,132 || 18–2 || 2–1
|- align="center" bgcolor="ccffcc"
| March 24 || Loyola Marymount* || #23 || Larry H. Miller Field || BYUtv || 4–1 || Michael Rucker (5–0) || J.D. Busfield (1–2) || None || 1,355 || 19–2 || 3–1
|- align="center" bgcolor="ffbbb"
| March 25 || Loyola Marymount* || #23 || Larry H. Miller Field || BYUtv || 5–10 || Cory Abbott (3–2) || Maverik Buffo (4–1) || None || 1,005 || 19–3 || 3–2
|- align="center" bgcolor="ccffcc"
| March 26 || Loyola Marymount* || #23 || Larry H. Miller Field || None || 7–4 || Easton Walker (1–0) || Tyler Cohen (2–3) || None || 1,350 || 20–3 || 4–2
|- align="center" bgcolor="ccffcc"
| March 31 || at Portland* || #24 || Joe Etzel Field || TheW.tv || 8–3 || Michael Rucker (6–0) || Jordan Wilcox (4–1) || None || 313 || 21–3 || 5–2
|-

|- align="center" bgcolor="ccffcc"
|April 1 || at Portland* || #24 || Joe Etzel Field || TheW.tv || 4–1 || Maverik Buffo (5–1) || Davis Tominaga (2–5) || Mason Marshall (3) || 382 || 22–3 || 6–2
|- align="center" bgcolor="ccffcc"
|April 2 || at Portland* || #24 || Joe Etzel Field || TheW.tv || 5–3 || Hayden Rogers (3–0) || Jordan Horak (1–2) || None || 311 || 23–3 || 7–2
|- align="center" bgcolor="ffbbb"
|April 4 || Arizona || #22 || Larry H. Miller Field || BYUtv || 5–11 || Bobby Dalbec (6–3) || Jordan Wood (0–1) || None || 2,825 || 23–4 || –
|- align="center" bgcolor="ccffcc"
|April 7 || San Diego* || #22 || Larry H. Miller Field || BYUtv || 12–2 || Michael Rucker (7–0) || Troy Conyers (4–4) || None || 2,681 || 24–4 || 8–2
|- align="center" bgcolor="ccffcc"
|April 8 || San Diego* || #22 || Larry H. Miller Field || TheW.tv || 13–1 || Maverik Buffo (6–1) || Gary Cornish (4–2) || None || 2,552 || 25–4 || 9–2
|- align="center" bgcolor="ffbbb"
|April 9 || San Diego* || #22 || Larry H. Miller Field || BYUtv || 7–13 || Nathan Kutcha (2–0) || Connor Williams (1–1) || None || 1,807 || 25–5 || 9–3
|- align="center" bgcolor="ccffcc"
|April 12 || Utah || #26 || Larry H. Miller Field || BYUtv || 14–3 || Hayden Rogers (4–0) || Tanner Thomas (0–1) || None || 2,937 || 26–5 || –
|- align="center" bgcolor="ffbbb"
|April 14 || at Saint Mary's* || #26 || Louis Guisto Field || TheW.tv || 4–5 || Drew Strotman (3–3) || Keaton Cenatiempo (1–1) || None || 156 || 26–6 || 9–4
|- align="center" bgcolor="ffbbb"
|April 15 || at Saint Mary's* || #26 || Louis Guisto Field || TheW.tv || 4–7 || Johnny York (4–3) || Maverik Buffo (6–2) || Cameron Neff (1) || 162 || 26–7 || 9–5
|- align="center" bgcolor="ccffcc"
|April 16 || at Saint Mary's* || #26 || Louis Guisto Field || TheW.tv || 5–4 || Bo Burrup (3–2) || Anthony Gonsolin (2–1) || Keaton Cenatiempo (2) || 179 || 27–7 || 10–5
|- align="center" bgcolor="ccffcc"
|April 22 || #25 Creighton ||#30 || Larry H. Miller Field || BYUtv || 13–4 || Michael Rucker (8–0) || Rollie Lacy (6–2) || None || 2,445 || 28–7 || –
|- align="center" bgcolor="ffbbb"
|April 23 || #25 Creighton || #30 || Larry H. Miller Field || TheW.tv || 2–10 || Jeff Albrecht (5–0) || Hayden Rogers (4–1) || None || 2,116 || 28–8 || –
|- align="center" bgcolor="ffbbb"
|April 23 || #25 Creighton || #30 || Larry H. Miller Field || TheW.tv || 5–8 || Keith Rogalla (4–2) || Jordan Wood 0–1) || None || 2,116 || 28–9 || –
|- align="center" bgcolor="CCCCCC"
|April 26 || at Utah Valley || – || Brent Brown Ballpark || KSL.com || colspan=7 style="text-align:center"| Ppd. until May 10 due to weather
|- align="center" bgcolor="ccffcc"
|April 28 || Gonzaga* || – || Larry H. Miller Field || BYUtv || 11–2 || Michael Rucker (9–0) || Brandon Bailey (6–3) || None || 748 || 29–9 || 11–5
|- align="center" bgcolor="ffbbb"
|April 29 || Gonzaga* || – || Larry H. Miller Field || BYUtv || 5–9 || Eli Morgan (8–1) || Hayden Rogers (4–2) || Wyatt Mills (5) || 1,323 || 29–10 || 11–6
|- align="center" bgcolor="ccffcc"
|April 30 || Gonzaga* || – || Larry H. Miller Field || BYUtv || 5–4 || Jordan Wood (1–1) || Wyatt Mills (2–2) || None || 1,487 || 30–10 || 12–6
|-

|- align="center" bgcolor="ffbbb"
|May 3 || Utah Valley || – || Larry H. Miller Field || BYUtv || 6–7 (10) || Jake Mayer (6–1) || Mason Marshall (1–2) || None || 1,719 || 30–11 || –
|- align="center" bgcolor="ccffcc"
|May 5 || at Pepperdine* || – || Eddy D. Field Stadium || TheW.tv || 9–5 || Michael Rucker (10–0) || A. J. Puckett (7–3) || Keaton Cenatiempo (3) || 411 || 31–11 || 13–6
|- align="center" bgcolor="ffbbb"
|May 6 || at Pepperdine* || – || Eddy D. Field Stadium || TheW.tv || 0–3 || Chandler Blanchard (3–1) || Hayden Rogers (4–3) || Ryan Wilson (5) || 501 || 31–12 || 13–7
|- align="center" bgcolor="ffbbb"
|May 7 || at Pepperdine* || – || Eddy D. Field Stadium || TheW.tv || 3–4 || Max Gamboa (2–6) || Riley Gates (2–1) || Max Green (1) || 673 || 31–13 || 13–8
|- align="center" bgcolor="ccffcc"
|May 10 || at Utah Valley || – || Brent Brown Ballpark || KSL.com || 17–6 || Hayden Rodgers (5–3) || Kaden Schmitt (0–2) || None || 4,120 || 32–13 || –
|- align="center" bgcolor="ffbbb"
|May 12 || at San Francisco* || – || Dante Benedetti Diamond at Max Ulrich Field || TheW.tv || 5–6 || Mack Meyer (3–2) || Mason Marshall (1–3) || None || 282 || 32–14 || 13–9
|- align="center" bgcolor="ccffcc"
|May 13 || at San Francisco* || – || Dante Benedetti Diamond at Max Ulrich Field || TheW.tv || 12–6 || Mason Marshall (2–3) || Thomas Ponticelli (3–6) || None || 314 || 33–14 || 14–9
|- align="center" bgcolor="ccffcc"
|May 14 || at San Francisco* || – || Dante Benedetti Diamond at Max Ulrich Field || TheW.tv || 9–3 ||  Keaton Cenatiempo (2–1) || James Kannenburg (6–5) || None || 551 || 34–14 || 15–9
|- align="center" bgcolor="ffbbb"
|May 17 || at Utah || – || Smith's Ballpark || P12 || 1–8 || Nolan Stouder (1–1) || Easton Walker (1–1) || None || 5,440 || 34–15 || –
|- align="center" bgcolor="ccffcc"
|May 19 || Santa Clara* || – || Larry H. Miller Field || BYUtv || 8–2 || Michael Rucker (11–0) || Steven Wilson (5–5) || None || 1,487 || 35–15 || 16–9
|- align="center" bgcolor="ccffcc"
|May 20 || Santa Clara* || – || Larry H. Miller Field || BYUtv || 9–8 || Mason Marshall (3–3) || Max Kuhns (1–4) || None || 1,647 || 36–15 || 17–9
|- align="center" bgcolor="ccffcc"
|May 21 || Santa Clara* || – || Larry H. Miller Field || ESPNU || 10–5 || Keaton Cenatiempo (3–1) || Jason Seever (6–3) || None || 2,541 || 37–15 || 18–9
|- align="center" bgcolor="ffbbb"
|May 26 || Gonzaga* || – || Banner Island Ballpark || TheW.tv || 3–5 || Brandon Bailey (9–3) || Michael Rucker (11–1) || None || 1,187 || 37–16 || –
|- align="center" bgcolor="ffbbb"
|May 27 || Pepperdine* || – || Banner Island Ballpark || TheW.tv || 2–7 || Ryan Wilson (2–0) || Keaton Cenatiempo (3–2) || None || 1,127 || 37–17 || –
|-

|-
| style="font-size:88%" | Rankings from Collegiate Baseball. Parenthesis indicate tournament seedings.
|-
| style="font-size:88%" | *West Coast Conference games

Radio Information
All but one BYU Baseball series had a radio/internet broadcast available. 36 games were broadcast on KOVO with Brent Norton (play-by-play) calling the games for his 24th consecutive season. A rotating selection of analysts were used. 29 of the games were simulcast on BYU Radio. BYU Radio also had 4 radio exclusives this season: Mar. 8 vs. Utah Valley,  Mar. 10 & 11 early vs. Niagara, and May 3 vs. Utah Valley. Robbie Bullough provided play by play for BYU Radio's exclusive games outside of May 3, which was a BYUtv simulcast.

Samford and Kansas both provided an internet broadcast through their respective athletic websites.

TV Announcers
March 3: Steven Davis & Kevin Wheeler 
March 4: Steven Davis & Kevin Wheeler
March 5: Steven Davis & Kevin Wheeler
March 8: Robbie Bullough & Marc Oslund
March 10: Robbie Bullough & Marc Oslund
March 11 (early): Robbie Bullough & Marc Oslund
March 11 (late): Brent Norton & Jeff Bills
March 12: Brent Norton & Cameron Coughlan
March 15: Spencer Linton, Gary Sheide, & Jason Shepherd
March 17: Spencer Linton, Gary Sheide, & Jason Shepherd
March 19: Spencer Linton, Gary Sheide, & Jason Shepherd
March 24: Spencer Linton, Gary Sheide, & Jason Shepherd
March 25: Spencer Linton, Gary Sheide, & Jason Shepherd
March 31: No commentators
April 1: Travis Demers & Keith Ramsey
April 2: No commentators
April 4: Spencer Linton, Gary Sheide, & Jason Shepherd
April 7: Spencer Linton, Gary Sheide, & Jason Shepherd
April 8: Brent Norton & Jeff Bills
April 9: Spencer Linton, Gary Sheide, & Jason Shepherd
April 12: Dave McCann, Gary Sheide, & Jason Shepherd
April 14: Daniel Conmy & Tyler Bendy
April 15: George Devine & Keith Ramsey
April 16: Tyler Bendy & Konrad Saint
April 22: Spencer Linton, Gary Sheide, & Jason Shepherd
April 23 (early): Brent Norton & Alex Wolfe
April 23 (late): Brent Norton & Cameron Coughlan
April 28: Spencer Linton, Gary Sheide, & Jason Shepherd
April 29: Spencer Linton, Gary Sheide, & Jason Shepherd
April 30: Spencer Linton, Gary Sheide, & Jason Shepherd
May 3: Spencer Linton, Gary Sheide, & Jason Shepherd
May 5: Sam Ravech
May 6: Steve Quis & Keith Ramsey
May 7: Sam Ravech
May 10: Jordan Bianucci & Ryan Pickens
May 12: Joe Castellano
May 13: George Devine
May 14: No commentators
May 17: Roxy Bernstein & Andy Lopez
May 19: Spencer Linton, Gary Sheide, & Jason Shepherd
May 20: Spencer Linton, Gary Sheide, & Jason Shepherd
May 21: Mike Couzens & Wes Clements
May 26: Steve Quis, Keith Ramsey, & Sarah Kezele
May 27: Steve Quis, Keith Ramsey, & Sarah Kezele

References 

2016 West Coast Conference baseball season
2016 team
2016 in sports in Utah